Peter John Hawkins (3 April 1924 – 8 July 2006) was a British actor. From the 1950s to 1980s he was one of the most sought-after voice artists for radio and television.

Early life
Peter John Hawkins was born on 3 April 1924 in Hargwyne Street in Brixton, south London. He made his first stage appearance as a member of the chorus in a musical. During his last year at school, he wrote, with three friends, a revue entitled The Five Bs, the name of their form. He worked at Pitman’s from the ages of 16 to 18, writing similar shows at a youth club. Hawkins joined the Royal Navy, entertaining with impressions for which he wrote scripts, and survived when the HMS Limbourne sank after being torpedoed escorting the cruiser Charybdis. He was rescued by Ronnie Hill, a theatre actor at the time, and while recovering he took part in plays, which resulted in his being taken into Combined Operations’ Entertainments productions of the Royal Naval Barracks’ Scran Bag.

Career

Scran Bag toured mainland Europe, then Canada before the SS Menestheus was built, which began their tour of the Far East, and ended up at the Lyric Theatre, Hammersmith. After the war Peter won a two-year place at the Central School of Speech and Drama. In 1950 he began his television career with the children’s variety programme Whirligig voicing the continuity puppet Mr Turnip. Throughout the show’s six-year run he played Alexander Scrope in Can We Help You? and voiced Willoughby as well, gaining a reputation for doing difficult character voices. This led to him becoming the voice of Bill and Ben, the Flower Pot Men in 1952, for which he invented their Oddle-Poddle language, becoming one of his most famous roles.

In 1956, Peter married actress Rosemary Miller, after meeting her on the first television adaptation of Toytown. Peter was the voice of Ernest the Policeman, a role he would reprise in the 1972 series, and Rosemary was Larry the Lamb. On 27th August 1959 they had a child named Silas, who they named if he grew up to be an actor. Despite his busy schedule, Peter spent lots of time with his son.

In 1958 he became all the voices for Captain Pugwash, which he would continue for the rest of the original black-and-white series and the 1974-75 series. Creator John Ryan praised him for his ability to use many different voices, but he had to be hidden behind a monitor during filming because the animators would be distracted by the facial expressions he made during recording. 

In 1963 he became the original voice of the Daleks in Doctor Who. It was him who decided that they would rise in pitch as they got angrier in order to stop them from becoming monotonous. Peter would voice the Daleks in every 1960s story, as well as  the two 1960s feature films, and he and fellow Dalek voice David Graham  would become lifelong friends.

In 1966 Peter voiced the Cybermen in the fourth and final part of the Doctor Who serial The Tenth Planet. For the subsequent three Cyberman serials he used an electrolarynx, which he described as very uncomfortable. Peter never returned afterwards as he had enough of having to fund it himself. He was, however, going to be the voice of K9 before John Leeson, who Peter had worked with on the first year of Thames Television’s Rainbow, won the role.

When Rainbow began in 1972, Peter was chosen to be the voice of Zippy. In the pilot he also voiced Sunshine, Bramble and Pillar, but after many policy changes they were removed. He tried to rewrite gags, which proved hard for the target audience, and so left the series despite being asked to stay. That same year he joined the ensemble of Dave Allen at Large, even writing various skits, and stayed until 1978. 

Other notable roles include the voice of Spotty Dog in The Woodentops, all the voices in The Adventures of Sir Prancelot, created by John Ryan, the voice of Money in the Access “Flexible Friend” adverts and various voices in The Family-Ness. According to son Silas, he gave thought to every role, yet never looked back at them.

Hobbies and collections
Hawkins was interested in jewellery, fossils, serious music and eating out, and supported Chelsea. He also had a and a collection of Japanese sword guards and Impressionist works, including those of Pierre-Auguste Renoir, Camille Pissarro and Claude Monet.

Health issues
Hawkins regularly smoked 20 Olivier in his prime, and later it would give him eczema. According to Silas, wife Rosemary Miller would constantly dress his rashes. In 1992 he began operation to remove a tumor in his brain, which left him unable to read and made him very drowsy. This led to his retirement, although he took pleasure in Silas’s voice work in shows such as Summerton Mill for CBeebies.

Death
Peter died on 8th July 2006, aged 82, of pneumonia. The funeral was held at St. Matthews in Queensway, where Silas was baptised. A showing of The Survivors, his first Doctor Who episode, was arranged, and Silas scattered his ashes at Fermain Bay, Guernsey, where the HMS Limbourne sank.

Filmography

Film

Television

Radio

References

External links

Voice of the Daleks dies at 82 Lester Haines (The Register) Thursday 20 July 2006 10:35 GMT
Daily Telegraph obituary
Times obituary

1924 births
2006 deaths
20th-century English male actors
English male radio actors
English male television actors
English male voice actors
Male actors from London
People from Brixton
Royal Navy personnel of World War II